Vinaphone is a Vietnamese major mobile network operator headquartered in Hanoi, Vietnam. Founded June 26, 1996, as a GSM launcher, Vinaphone is the second network (after MobiFone) and currently the second largest provider in Vietnam.

Partnership 
At 17 Nov. 2009, VinaPhone had joined Conexus Mobile Alliance 
At the beginning of September 2014 Vinaphone signed a strategic co-operation agreement with Vodafone.

Market share and competitors
Vinaphone had a market share (estimated based on revenues) of 30% in 2012. 
Its main competitors are Viettel with 40.67% market share and MobiFone with 17.9%, which is also owned by VNPT. They control almost 90% of the market, with the rest controlled by Vietnamobile with 8%, Gmobile (formerly Beeline) with 3.2% and S-Fone with 0.1%.

History

1996: Establishment of VinaPhone network.

1997: Establishment of Vietnam Telecom Services Company (VinaPhone). 
Establishment of Regional Telecom Services Centres 1, 2, 3.

2006: Changing Logo (from GPC to VinaPhone) as Vietnam officially became a member of the WTO.

2009: VinaPhone was the first operator to launch 3G services.

2015: VinaPhone was the first operator to launch 4G services

2020: VinaPhone was the first operator to prelaunch 5G services

Popularity
Vinaphone is considered Operator of State Servants as most of its subscribers are civil service employees.

Sponsorship
The company has been the official jersey sponsor of the Vietnamese national basketball team.

References

 "Vinaphone triển khai đầu số 088 trong năm 2016" . Vinaphones. 7 March 2016.

Mobile phone companies of Vietnam
Companies based in Hanoi
Vietnamese brands
Telecommunications companies established in 1996